A Pacifist organization promotes the pacifist principle of renouncing war and violence for political ends.  They are distinguished from organizations concerned only with removing nuclear weapons from war, though those organization may call for suspension of hostilities as well.  Other organizations include those that deal with other concerns, but have a strong pacifist element.

Pacifist organizations:
 Anglican Pacifist Fellowship
 Central Committee for Conscientious Objectors
 Christian Peacemaker Teams
 Fellowship of Reconciliation
 Mennonites
 Peace Brigades International
 Peace Pledge Union
 Religious Society of Friends (Quakers)
 Soka University of America
 War Resisters' International
 War Resisters League

"Nuclear pacifist" organizations :
 CND
 Pugwash

Organizations that cite pacifism as an aim :
 Greenpeace

External links
 Nonviolence.org
 Pacifist Party of America (Political Party)
 Peace Pledge Union

Peace organizations
Pacifism